TG-5 may refer to:

 TG5, Italian TV news program
 Aeronca TG-5, a three-seat 1942 training glider
 Olympus Tough TG-5, a weatherised digital compact camera announced by Olympus Corporation on May 17, 2017